Moeen or Moein or Moien is a given name and surname.  It is a Quranic name which means: helper, supporter, or provider of refuge.

Notable persons with the name include:

Persons with the given name
 Moein (singer) (born 1951), Iranian singer
 Moeen U Ahmed (born 1953), Bangladeshi military officer
 Moeen Akhtar (1950–2011), Pakistani actor and comedian
 Moeen Ali (born 1987), English cricketer
 Moeen Faruqi, Pakistani writer
 Moeenuddin Ahmad Qureshi (1930-2016), Pakistani economist and politician
 Moin Khan (born 1971), Pakistani cricketer

Persons with the surname
 Ali Moeen (born 1968), Pakistani dramatist and lyricist
 Mohammad Moeen (1914–1971),  Iranian scholar of Persian literature and Iranology
 Mostafa Moeen (born 1951), Iranian politician

See also
 Moin (disambiguation)

References

Arabic-language surnames
Arabic masculine given names